María de los Dolores Padierna Luna (born 8 May 1958) is a Mexican politician affiliated with the PRD.

She currently serves as Senator of the LXII Legislature of the Mexican Congress. She also served as Deputy of the Congress for two Legislatures, between 1997 until 2000  and from 2003 until 2006.

Padierna Luna is the candidate for borough president in Cuauhtémoc, Mexico City in the 2021 election despite accusations that she and her husband, René Bejarano are corrupt.

References

1958 births
Living people
Politicians from Guanajuato
People from Dolores Hidalgo
Members of the Senate of the Republic (Mexico) for Mexico City
Deputies of the LXIV Legislature of Mexico
Party of the Democratic Revolution politicians
Members of the Constituent Assembly of Mexico City
Morena (political party) politicians
Members of the Congress of Mexico City
20th-century Mexican politicians
20th-century Mexican women politicians
21st-century Mexican politicians
21st-century Mexican women politicians
Universidad Autónoma Metropolitana alumni
Academic staff of the Instituto Politécnico Nacional
Deputies of the LVII Legislature of Mexico
Deputies of the LIX Legislature of Mexico
Senators of the LXII and LXIII Legislatures of Mexico
Members of the Chamber of Deputies (Mexico) for Mexico City
Women members of the Senate of the Republic (Mexico)
Women members of the Chamber of Deputies (Mexico)